Jon "Jops" Hare (born 20 January 1966, Ilford, Essex, England) is an English computer game designer, video game artist, musician and one of many founder members of the early UK games industry as co-founder and director, along with Chris Yates, of Sensible Software, one of the most successful European games development companies of the late 1980s and 1990s.

In 2006 the Sensible Software game Sensible World of Soccer, for which Hare was Creative Director and Lead Designer, was entered into a Games Canon of the 10 most important video games of all time by Stanford University, it was the only game developed in Europe to make the list which also included Spacewar!, Star Raiders, Zork, Tetris, SimCity, Super Mario Bros. 3, Civilization, Doom, and the Warcraft series.

Hare has the unique distinction of a #1 football game in each of 4 consecutive decades MicroProse Soccer 1988, Sensible World of Soccer 1994, Sensible Soccer (mobile) 2004 and Sociable Soccer 2019, developed by Tower Studios for whom he has been co-founder and CEO since 2004.

Visiting Professor of Games for Anglia Ruskin University, Cambridge since 2017, Hare has also been a voting member of BAFTA since 2004 for whom he frequently chairs Games Awards Juries.

Biography

Gaming career

1980s
Following a year of working as a consultant games artist on various ZX81, ZX Spectrum and Commodore 64 games in 1985, Hare became co-founder of Sensible Software with school friend Chris Yates in 1986 working as co-designer and lead artist of all of Sensible's 8-bit era games including Parallax, Wizball, Microprose Soccer and SEUCK.

1990s
As Sensible Software moved into the 16-bit era in the 1990s Hare took a more active role in overseeing the business activities of the company while continuing his role as the lead designer, creative director, and predominant lead artist and musical composer of games such as Wizkid and the Sensible Soccer series, the Cannon Fodder series and Mega Lo Mania, some of the most popular software franchises of the mid-1990s. Hare and Yates sold Sensible Software to Codemasters in May 1999.

2000s
Since the sale of Sensible Software to Codemasters in 1999, Hare has worked in the capacity of a consultant designer on many games including numerous strategy, action and sports games including Real World Golf and Sensible Soccer 2006. Hare is also one of the founders and owner of games company Tower Studios, founded in 2004 with two former Bitmap Brothers it has developed a number of successful titles including mobile phone versions of Cannon Fodder and Sensible Soccer.

Hare has been a voting member of BAFTA across all media since 2004 and works periodically for BAFTA as both a juror and a mentor.

In 2006, Hare contributed a weekly politics feature to UK video game radio show One Life Left.

Hare then became a director of development at Nikitova Games, a games developer with offices in Chicago, Los Angeles and London; and development studios in Kyiv, Ukraine. They worked on several projects for Nintendo DS and Wii, such as Showtime Championship Boxing and the as-yet-unreleased CCTV.

In July 2009, Hare joined Jagex (makers of browser-based MMORPG RuneScape and casual gaming website FunOrb) as their Head of Publishing.

2010s and 2020s
In January 2010, Hare announced the launch of a new independent online games publisher, Me-Stars, a games network for browser and iPhone platforms. All Me-Stars games were to feature in game Me-Stars to pick up, win and redeem and interactive high scores and friends lists that appear inside each game during gameplay, depicted by the animated photo-realistic heads found in Me-Motes Messenger (released January 2010). However the Me-Stars games network was never launched and instead became a relaunch of Tower Studios as a publisher on many mobile and online downloadable platforms of classic licensed games from the 80s - 90s as well as new designs from Jon and other game developers. Tower's most successful title as a publisher to date has been 'Speedball 2 Evolution' a remake of The Bitmap Brothers classic game which topped the iPad and Mac charts across Europe in 2011 and was followed up with 'Speedball 2 HD' in 2013 on PC. 
In 2014 Hare also announced the imminent release of 'Word Explorer' his first original game in 20 years, developed in collaboration with award-winning Polish development team Vivid Games and published through a number of different publishing partners including Mastertronic and Big Fish.

Hare enjoyed a 6-year tenure as visiting lecturer at University of Westminster, London for "Professional Practice in Games Development" from 2011 to 2016 as well as numerous national and international lectures on games design, business and his career at universities across Europe as far apart as Cambridge, Istanbul, Copenhagen and Stockholm. Following this grounding in higher education in 2014 he launched, in collaboration with Professor Carsten Maple, a network of UK Games Industry Courses and Games companies known as B.U.G.S. 'Business and University Games Syndicate'. The launch event of BUGS at BAFTA featured numerous talks from games industry bodies and endorsements of BUGS from Ian Livingstone and Ed Vaizey MP, the then government minister for culture. BUGS function being to vet and host links to the completed and published games of students from all BUGS universities (approximately 30% of all UK games students) and to make these games accessible to all games industry companies signed to BUGS (approximately 35% of all UK games companies by employee numbers) to help the companies to identify the top games students in the UK and to give the students industry oriented objectives during their studies.
Since 2017 Hare has been Visiting Professor of Games for Anglia Ruskin University in Cambridge

In 2013, Sensible Software 1986–1999 a biographical book about Sensible Software featuring extensive interviews with Hare, and numerous other Sensible members and game industry personalities, plus over 100 pages of artwork reproductions of much of Hare's earlier work as a game artist, was launched by independent book publisher ROM. Written by games journalist Gary Penn it was the first and, to date, only book about the computer games industry to feature in the BAFTA library and archive in London.

In 2016, via exhibitions in the London Science Museum, Gamescom and numerous other European games events, Jon Hare demonstrated the continuing development of a new football game Sociable Soccer, developed in partnership with Finnish development team Combo Breaker on numerous PC, console, mobile and VR platforms, despite a cancelled Kickstarter for the game in the previous year. Following a brief debut in 2017 on Steam Early Access, Sociable Soccer went on to become one of the early titles on the Apple Arcade service in 2019, with annual updates for the same platform following in 2020 and 2021 and the launch of versions for PC and console versions of the title announced for 2022.

Musicianship
Hare has also been a prolific songwriter since 1982 and has featured in a number of bands over the years as a singer and guitarist, including Essex outfits Hamsterfish, Dark Globe and Touchstone, all of which also featured Chris Yates on lead guitar. Dark Globe was particularly important in the formation of the creative relationship between Hare and Yates prior to the formation of Sensible Software and rehearsed in the house of Richard Ashrowan one of Hare's closest friends since childhood. From 1990 onwards, Hare was also a frequent musical collaborator with Richard Joseph, another close friend with whom he co-wrote and arranged all of Sensible Software's best known musical tracks including the soundtrack for Cannon Fodder the GBA version of which was also nominated for a BAFTA in 2000, and is still the only small-format soundtrack to be recognized by BAFTA to this day. In 1995 Hare and Joseph embarked upon an epic 32 track soundtrack for the multimedia product Sex 'n' Drugs 'n' Rock 'n' Roll, signed to Warner Interactive, however in 1998 Warner bowed out of the games market and their Magnum Opus was only ever released as a limited edition audio CD. Since 2000 Hare has also written for and performed with a number of outfits including the Little Big Band featuring Jack Monck and Sid 80s featuring Ben Daglish.

Hare is also known for writing the music for a number of Sensible Software's games, including Cannon Fodder, Sensible Soccer, Sensible Golf and the never released Sex 'n' Drugs 'n' Rock 'n' Roll, which featured over 30 tracks written and arranged by Hare and his frequent musical collaborator, Richard Joseph.

Games designed or co-designed

References

External links

Hare's profile on MobyGames

1966 births
Amiga people
British rock singers
British rock guitarists
British songwriters
British technology company founders
British video game designers
Commodore 64 music
Living people
People from Ilford
Sensible Software
Video game artists
Video game composers